Juan José Alvear Calleja (born 25 September 1941) is a Spanish field hockey player. He competed in the men's tournament at the 1968 Summer Olympics.

References

External links
 
 
 

1941 births
Living people
Spanish male field hockey players
Olympic field hockey players of Spain
Field hockey players at the 1968 Summer Olympics
Field hockey players from Madrid